Severe Clear is an album by pianist Andy LaVerne recorded in 1990 and released on the Danish label, SteepleChase.

Reception 

Paul Kohler of AllMusic stated "this recording finds Laverne in top gear playing some of the most incredible chord voicings".

Track listing 
All compositions by Andy LaVerne.

 "Severe Clear" – 7:23
 "No Guts, No Glory" – 8:39
 "Plasma Pool" – 9:10
 "Fact or Fiction" – 6:13
 "Rick's Trick" – 6:31
 "Trajectory" – 7:59
 "Three Times Twice" – 9:16
 "Ethereal Spheres" – 8:20

Personnel 
Andy LaVerne – piano
Tim Hagans – trumpet
Rick Margitza – tenor saxophone
Steve LaSpina – bass
Anton Fig – drums

References 

 

Andy LaVerne albums
1990 albums
SteepleChase Records albums